"Devil or Angel" is a song written by Blanche Carter and originally recorded by the Clovers in 1955, where it went to number four on the US R&B Best Sellers chart. It was re-recorded by John Bailey after he left the Clovers and formed another Clovers group for Lana Records in 1965.

Later versions
The song was recorded by Bobby Vee, with veteran session drummer Earl Palmer among the studio musicians, and reached number 6 in the US charts in 1960. It was Vee's first Top 10 hit.  This version was also a crossover hit on the R&B chart.
It was later recorded by both, Johnny Crawford and Jesse Winchester. Neither of those versions charted on the Billboard Hot 100 singles chart.
The Hollywood Flames released a version of the song as a single in 1960.
Tony Scotti recorded the song in 1969. The single peaked at #117 on Billboard's "Bubbling Under" chart.
Ezra Furman recorded a cover of the song featured in Netflix's Sex Education (TV series).

References 

1955 songs
1960 singles
The Clovers songs
Bobby Vee songs
The Hollywood Flames songs
Atco Records singles